Covington Middle School may refer to:
 Covington Middle School - Covington Community School Corporation - Covington, Indiana
 Covington Middle School - Austin Independent School District - Austin, Texas
 Covington Middle School - Evergreen Public Schools - Vancouver, Washington